Carolyn Gardner is a World Series of Poker champion in the 1983 $500 Ladies - Limit 7 Card Stud event.
  
As of 2008, her total WSOP tournament winnings exceed $61,701.

World Series of Poker bracelets

References

American poker players
World Series of Poker bracelet winners
Female poker players
Living people
Year of birth missing (living people)